Judith Anne Smith (born October 2, 1963) is a senior judge of the Superior Court of the District of Columbia and former magistrate judge of the same court.

Education and career 
Smith earned her Bachelor of Arts from Pennsylvania State University in 1985, and her Juris Doctor from Georgetown University Law Center in 1992. While attending law school, she interned at the Legal Aid Society of the District of Columbia, National Criminal Justice Association and at the Public Defender Service for the District of Columbia.

After graduating, she clerked for Judge A. Franklin Burgess of the D.C. Superior Court. In 1993, Smith opened a law practice. From 1994 to 2001 she returned to the Public Defender Service as a staff attorney and later as a special education attorney. In 2001, she went to work in the Office of Special Education of the District of Columbia Public Schools as an executive director.

D.C. Superior Court 
On September 15, 2008, Chief Judge Rufus G. King III, of the Superior Court of the District of Columbia, appointed Smith as a magistrate judge of the court.

President Barack Obama nominated Smith on March 25, 2010, to a 15-year term as an associate judge on the Superior Court of the District of Columbia to the seat vacated by Geoffrey M. Alprin. On April 20, 2010, the Senate Committee on Homeland Security and Governmental Affairs held a hearing on her nomination. On April 28, 2010, the Committee reported her nomination favorably to the senate floor. On June 22, 2010, the full Senate confirmed her nomination by voice vote. Her term expired on January 21, 2022, at which point she took senior status.

References

1963 births
Living people
21st-century American judges
21st-century American women judges
Georgetown University Law Center alumni
Judges of the Superior Court of the District of Columbia
Lawyers from Columbus, Ohio
Pennsylvania State University alumni